Danny van Poppel (born 26 July 1993) is a Dutch professional road racing cyclist, who rides for UCI WorldTeam .

Early and personal life
Danny van Poppel is the son of former professional cyclists Jean-Paul van Poppel and Leontine van der Lienden; his older brother Boy van Poppel and cousin Bram Welten are also professional cyclists.

Career
Van Poppel started in the 2013 Tour de France at the age of 19, and thus became the youngest cyclist to ride the Tour de France since World War II. On the opening stage, he finished in third place and wore the white jersey (representing the young rider classification) the following day, as the classification's leader Marcel Kittel was wearing the yellow jersey of overall race leader. He remained in the race until the final week, when his team withdrew him on the second rest day.

Van Poppel joined  for the 2014 season, after his previous team –  – folded at the end of the 2013 season. He was named in the start list for the 2015 Vuelta a España, where he took the biggest win of his career to date on stage 12. Subsequently, it was announced that van Poppel would join  for the 2016 season.

In May 2018, he was named in the startlist for the 2018 Giro d'Italia.

Major results

Cyclo-cross

2009–2010
 UCI Junior World Cup
2nd Hoogerheide
 Junior Superprestige
2nd Diegem
 2nd Junior Sint-Michielsgestel
 Junior Gazet van Antwerpen
3rd Loenhout
2010–2011
 1st  National Junior Championships
 Junior Gazet van Antwerpen
1st Loenhout
1st Koppenberg
 Junior Superprestige
1st Diegem
2nd Gavere
 UCI Junior World Cup
2nd Pontchâteau

Road
Source: 

2010
 1st  Overall Driedaagse van Axel
1st Stage 4
 2nd GP Bati-Metallo
 4th Overall Liège–La Gleize
1st Stage 2 (TTT)
 10th Overall Course de la Paix Juniors
1st Stage 1
2011
 2nd Overall Driedaagse van Axel
1st Stage 5
 3rd Time trial, National Junior Championships
 8th Overall Course de la Paix Juniors
1st Stage 6
2012
 Thüringen Rundfahrt der U23
1st Stages 1 (TTT), 2 & 5
 1st Stage 1 Vuelta Ciclista a León
 2nd Overall Istrian Spring Trophy
 5th Grand Prix de la ville de Nogent-sur-Oise
 6th Arno Wallaard Memorial
 10th Overall Olympia's Tour
2013
 3rd Handzame Classic
 5th Ronde van Drenthe
 5th RideLondon–Surrey Classic
 7th Brussels Cycling Classic
 8th Overall Tour de Picardie
2014
 1st Prologue Tour de Luxembourg
 3rd Scheldeprijs
 3rd Grote Prijs Jef Scherens
 4th Grand Prix of Aargau Canton
 5th Kampioenschap van Vlaanderen
 7th Overall Driedaagse van West-Vlaanderen
1st Stage 1
2015
 1st Stage 12 Vuelta a España
 2nd Grand Prix Pino Cerami
 3rd Road race, National Championships
 4th Overall Tour de Wallonie
1st  Points classification
1st Stages 2 & 5
 4th Grand Prix Impanis-Van Petegem
 5th Trofeo Santanyi–Ses Salines–Campos
 5th Scheldeprijs
 6th Overall Driedaagse van West-Vlaanderen
1st Stage 2
 6th Nokere Koerse
 8th Kampioenschap van Vlaanderen
2016
 Vuelta a Burgos
1st  Points classification
1st Stages 1 & 3
 1st Stage 2 Tour de Yorkshire
 1st Stage 2 Arctic Race of Norway
 1st  Sprints classification, Three Days of De Panne
 4th EuroEyes Cyclassics
 6th Scheldeprijs
2017
 1st Prologue Herald Sun Tour
 1st Stage 5 Tour de Pologne
2018
 1st Halle–Ingooigem
 1st Binche–Chimay–Binche
 1st Stage 1 Volta a la Comunitat Valenciana
 2nd Road race, National Championships
 2nd Clásica de Almería
 3rd Famenne Ardenne Classic
 7th Dwars door het Hageland
2019
 5th Gent–Wevelgem
 7th Dwars door Vlaanderen
 7th Omloop van het Houtland
2020
 1st Gooikse Pijl
 3rd Paris–Chauny
 4th Clásica de Almería
 5th Milano–Torino
2021
 1st Egmont Cycling Race
 1st Binche–Chimay–Binche
 1st  Points classification, Benelux Tour
 2nd Dwars door het Hageland
 2nd Gooikse Pijl
 2nd Omloop van het Houtland
 3rd Grote Prijs Marcel Kint
 4th Scheldeprijs
 4th Eurométropole Tour
 4th Antwerp Port Epic
 5th Paris–Tours
 6th Clásica de Almería
 6th Elfstedenronde
 7th Paris–Bourges
 8th Brussels Cycling Classic
2022
 2nd Scheldeprijs
 2nd Rund um Köln
 3rd Ronde van Limburg
 4th Road race, UEC European Championships
 5th Overall Saudi Tour
 5th Eschborn–Frankfurt

Grand Tour general classification results timeline

References

External links

 
 
 Danny van Poppel profile at Cycling Base
 Danny van Poppel profile at Vacansoleil Pro Cycling Team

1993 births
Living people
Dutch male cyclists
Sportspeople from Utrecht (city)
UCI Road World Championships cyclists for the Netherlands
Dutch Vuelta a España stage winners
Cyclists from Utrecht (province)